Cardiac (Elias Wirtham) is a fictional character, appearing in American comic books published by Marvel Comics. The character was created by writer David Michelinie and penciller Erik Larsen and first appeared in The Amazing Spider-Man #342 in December 1990. 

Wirtham is portrayed as an anti-hero, once a  physician and surgeon, he was driven to become a vigilante after the death of his brother Joshua, which he sees as being caused by corporate greed. He has upgraded his physical body, replacing his heart with a beta-particle reactor which allows him to channel energy through a vibranium weave mesh under his skin. This has given him enhanced speed, agility, and reflexes as well as being able to channel the energy through his fists. His unyielding approach to justice has bought him into conflict with a number of heroes, most notably Spider-Man.

Publication history
Created by writer David Michelinie and penciller Erik Larsen, he first appeared as Elias Wirtham in The Amazing Spider-Man #342 (December 1990) and as Cardiac in The Amazing Spider-Man #344 (February 1991).

Fictional character biography

Wirtham is a physician and surgeon, and the owner and administrator of a biological research firm. Elias Wirtham is driven by his brother's death to research life-saving medical practices. His brother Joshua's death was the result of corporate greed. A corporation had a cure for his condition ready, but did not distribute the medicine due to it not being a "profitable" time for them, hence Cardiac's motivation against corporations. As a part of his research, Elias replaces his heart with a beta-particle reactor, which supplies energy throughout vibranium weave mesh under his skin. This energy, channeled through his muscles, increases his speed, agility, and reflexes, and can also be fired through his fists or the power staff he wields. He adopts the moniker "Cardiac" in reference to the source of his power.

Fighting resumes
Cardiac becomes a vigilante, believing himself an instrument of justice. He first encounters Spider-Man while raiding Sapridyne Chemicals, a company owned by Justin Hammer which possesses chemicals vital for the production of cocaine. Hammer hires the Rhino to kill Cardiac for raiding his company, but Cardiac defeats him. Cardiac next destroys the house and property of Albert Brukner, a corrupt Savings & Loan broker, and then attacks a subsidiary of Stane International that manufactured dangerous electronic dolls for children. He invades Stane International itself to destroy designs for a sonic missile that produce the effects of nerve gas.

Cardiac targets a filmmaker whose film is indirectly responsible for a boy murdering his own family. However, Cardiac incidentally encounters Styx and Stone and is inadvertently embroiled in a fight between Styx, Stone, and Spider-Man. At different times fighting each of them, Cardiac eventually cooperates with Spider-Man; together, they defeat Styx and Stone. Afterward, Spider-Man attempts to restrain Cardiac, but he escapes. Cardiac subsequently battles Code: Blue.

He returns periodically to perform his version of justice. He will kill criminals, but he is often bothered by his conscience as a result. When he targets a shipment of drugs, Cardiac again encounters Spider-Man, defeating the hero. Cardiac destroys the shipment, saying that he wasn't "there to destroy a misguided hero". Cardiac helps NightWatch to take down the corrupt corporation which gave him his powers. Cardiac also confronts Johnny Blaze and Ghost Rider during Blaze's mission to rescue his missing son from an evil corporation. When Wolverine seemingly goes on a rampage after having fallen under the influence of an alien, Cardiac is one of the many superheroes who attempts to stop him. Pairing with Solo is not enough, and they are swiftly defeated. Wolverine turns Cardiac's weapon on a nearby building. Cardiac is stunned and buried under several large chunks of masonry.

The Initiative 
Elias was listed as a "potential recruit" for the Initiative program, according to Civil War: Battle Damage Report.

Fear Itself
During the Fear Itself storyline, Cardiac deals with the fear and chaos in his area when he comes across Charles Davies, CEO of Jerixo Healthcare, and tries to help his son who has meningitis.

Working with Superior Spider-Man
As Dr. Elias Wirtham, he opens the new Hospital for Emergency Aid and Recuperative Therapy (H.E.A.R.T.) in the former site of Mister Negative's homeless shelter. As Cardiac he has stolen items to help aid patients being treated there. On a trip to "procure" a device to help a girl with severe brain damage from "The Boneyard" (a police impound for confiscated supervillain items), he fights with the Superior Spider-Man (Doctor Octopus' mind in Peter Parker's body). Due to Peter's interference with Doctor Octopus, Cardiac is able to temporarily stun Spider-Man with a strong blast and escape with the Neurolitic Scanner (a device that Doctor Octopus had invented to develop his mind link to his tentacles), but not without being tagged by an old spider-tracer. Wirtham is preparing the Neurolitic Scanner that he previously stole to scan the brain of his patient Amy Chen to find a damaged area of her brain. It becomes difficult due to the complexity of the device. Cardiac replies that the only one who can handle it properly is Otto Octavius. When Wirtham is preparing for his surgery, the alarms at H.E.A.R.T. Clinic activate. As Wirtham changes into Cardiac, he notices a Spider-Tracer as Otto arrives. Otto demands that Cardiac surrenders the Neurolitic Scanner, and Cardiac refuses. They battle in the hospital. While Otto tries to fend off the attacks, Cardiac tries to delay him but fails. Otto finds the Neurolitic Scanner on Amy's head and even tries to retrieve it, but Peter refuses to allow him to do so until Cardiac manages to stop him. Otto demands an explanation, and Cardiac reveals that when Otto tried to kill the planet with his Heat Satellites, he didn't considered about those who were already sick like Amy (whose parents died in an accident caused by his scheme), and she barely survived with severe brain damage. Otto feels remorse for this and decides to help Cardiac with the surgery, offering to perform the surgery himself. Even though Otto is having minor afflictions with his hand, the surgery is a success. Cardiac thanks Spider-Man for the help, and Otto replies that he was wrong about him and offers his help on anything which makes Cardiac allow Otto to borrow the Neurolitic Scanner.

Dr. Wirtham oversees the operation of Aunt May's leg and tells her that her leg is now fully healed upon completion of the surgery. When Otto has plans to make artificial legs for Flash Thompson with him being the first subject for this operation, Wirtham worries about some last-minute add-ins to the procedure. When the Superior Spider-Man gets the Venom symbiote on him and gets it under his control, he knocks Cardiac aside.

When the Goblin Underground is attacking Manhattan, Cardiac is seen fighting the Goblin King's minions. While Cardiac was away fighting the Goblin King's minions, the Goblin King has the H.E.A.R.T. Clinic destroyed.

Powers and abilities
Cardiac's heart has been surgically replaced with a compact beta-particle reactor, which grants Cardiac power. He has the ability to channel beta particles through the neural web of his vibranium-mesh skin into his muscles thereby endowing him with superhuman strength and regeneration, and enhanced speed, agility, reflexes and endurance, and he can channel these particles through external objects (such as his pulse staff and hang glider). He wields his pulse staff which fires concussive force bolts in a distinctive pulse-like energy signature, and rides a beta-propelled stingray hang-glider, which were both invented by Wirtham and his associates. His vibranium-mesh skin is also able to stop a couple bullet shots before the beta-particle energy is depleted.

Dr. Elias Wirtham's business administrative skills provide him a strong power base with a number of connections to various enterprises. He has also earned an M.D. degree and is an accomplished physician and surgeon.

References

External links
 World of Black Heroes: Cardiac Biography
 
 Profile at Spiderfan.org
 Profile at ComicVine.com

Characters created by David Michelinie
Characters created by Erik Larsen
Comics characters introduced in 1990
Fictional African-American people
Fictional characters from New York City
Fictional physicians
Fictional stick-fighters
Fictional surgeons
Marvel Comics characters with accelerated healing
Marvel Comics characters with superhuman strength
Marvel Comics cyborgs
Marvel Comics male superheroes
Marvel Comics male supervillains
Marvel Comics superheroes
Marvel Comics supervillains
Spider-Man characters
Vigilante characters in comics